Legionella yabuuchiae is a bacterium from the genus  Legionella which was isolated from industrial wastes in contaminated soils in Japan.

References

External links
Type strain of Legionella yabuuchiae at BacDive -  the Bacterial Diversity Metadatabase

Legionellales
Bacteria described in 2007